Punctoterebra textilis is a species of sea snail, a marine gastropod mollusk in the family Terebridae, the auger snails.

Description

Distribution

References

External links
 Pilsbry H.A. (1904). New Japanese marine Mollusca: Gastropoda. Proceedings of the Academy of Natural Sciences of Philadelphia. 56: 3–32 [10 February], 33–37 [18 February], 6 pls
 Fedosov, A. E.; Malcolm, G.; Terryn, Y.; Gorson, J.; Modica, M. V.; Holford, M.; Puillandre, N. (2020). Phylogenetic classification of the family Terebridae (Neogastropoda: Conoidea). Journal of Molluscan Studies

Terebridae
Gastropods described in 1844